Larger than Life may refer to:

Film and television
Larger than Life (film), a 1996 American comedy
Larger than Life, a 1998 short film by Ellory Elkayem
Carol Channing: Larger than Life, a 2012 documentary about Carol Channing
"Larger than Life" (House), a television episode

Literature
Larger than Life (novel), a 1960 novel by Dino Buzzati
"Larger than Life", an essay on E. E. "Doc" Smith by Robert A. Heinlein, in Heinlein's 1980 collection Expanded Universe

Theatre
Larger than Life, an adaptation of Somerset Maugham's Theatre (novel)

Music

Albums
Larger than Life (Jody Watley album), 1989
Larger than Life (The Ten Tenors album), 2004
Larger than Life (EP), by Paragon, 2008

Songs
"Larger than Life" (song), by the Backstreet Boys, 1999
"Larger than Life", by They Might Be Giants, a B-side of I Palindrome I, 1992
"Larger than Life", by Downhere from Downhere, 2001
"Larger than Life", by the Feelers from Playground Battle, 2003
"Larger than Life", by Gov't Mule from Dose, 1998
"Larger than Life", by Kiss from Alive II, 1977
"Larger than Life", by Leslie Phillips from Black and White in a Grey World, 1985
"Larger than Life", by Lita Ford from Dangerous Curves, 1991
"Larger than Life", by Sonata Arctica from Pariah's Child, 2014